The Derby dello Stretto is an association football derby in Southern Italy contested by Messina and Reggina. The phrase translates into English as Derby of the Strait, since the two clubs are based in the towns of Messina and Reggio Calabria on the opposite sides of the Strait of Messina which separates mainland Italy from Sicily.

The derby has mostly been played in lower level and cup competitions. Only six derbies have been played in Serie A, during the three seasons from 2004 to 2007 when both clubs played in the Italian top level. At the end of the 2006–07 season Messina were relegated, followed by Reggina in 2008–09. As of the 2016–17 season, both clubs play in Group C of the Lega Pro, one of the three regional groups of the Italian third level.

Statistics
As of 28 April 2017

References

External links

Stretto